Tom Browne (born 1968), known professionally as Tom Fisher, is an English actor and director who has appeared in various films, including Van Helsing, Shanghai Knights, The Young Victoria, The Mummy Returns, Enigma, Holy Flying Circus, The King and The Illusionist.

Fisher directed the feature film Radiator under his real name Tom Browne.

Filmography

References

External links

1968 births
Male actors from London
English male film actors
English male television actors
People from the London Borough of Camden
Living people